The Lysterfield Park is a public park located in the Greater Melbourne region of Victoria, Australia. When combined with the adjacent Churchill National Park, the two parks comprise  in the Dandenong Valley and the Dandenong Ranges that are a haven for native birds, mammals and reptiles, and provide recreational opportunities.

Lysterfield Park was created following the decommissioning of the Lysterfield Reservoir (built in 1936) and placement of its catchment under the management of the then National Park Service in 1979.

Features
Lysterfield Park was the venue for mountain biking events of the 2006 Commonwealth Games.
 
It features a wide array of trails suitable for XC and trail MTB riding. The trails are well signposted and give clear indication of the level of difficulty they present to the rider. Trail management over recent years 2012 - 2015 has led to vastly improved drainage, usage of natural and man-made features and as a result trail conditions are much improved.

Lysterfield's location, range and variety of trails and natural environment make it one of the better known MTB locations near Melbourne.

In 2008, several emergency markers were installed in the park to allow callers to emergency services to give their location more precisely.

See also

 Protected areas of Victoria

References

External links
Swimming at Lysterfield Park
Parks Victoria's Lysterfield Park page
Commonwealth Games' Lysterfield Park page
 Mountain Bike Trail Map (Parks Victoria)

Parks in Melbourne
City of Casey
2006 Commonwealth Games venues
Cycling at the 2006 Commonwealth Games